The 1987 Holiday Bowl was a college football bowl game played December 30, 1987, in San Diego, California. It was part of the 1987 NCAA Division I-A football season. It featured the 18th-ranked Iowa Hawkeyes and the 10–2 Wyoming Cowboys.

Scoring summary
Wyoming placekicker Greg Worker kicked field goals of 43 and 38 yards as the Cowboys jumped out to an early 6–0 lead. Quarterback Craig Burnett found James Loving for a 15-yard touchdown, and Wyoming doubled its lead to 12–0 at the end of 1 quarter. In the second quarter, Iowa blocked a punt and ran it back 10 yards for a touchdown, making it 12–7 Wyoming. Wyoming's Gerald Abraham scored on a 3-yard rushing touchdown, to give Wyoming a 19–7 halftime lead.

In the fourth quarter, Iowa's Wright intercepted a Wyoming pass, and returned it 33 yards for a touchdown, cutting the margin to 19–14.  David Hudson scored on a 1-yard touchdown run, capping an 86-yard drive. The two-point conversion attempt failed, but Iowa still had a 20–19 lead. They were able to hold on for the win.

References

Holiday Bowl
Holiday Bowl
Iowa Hawkeyes football bowl games
Wyoming Cowboys football bowl games
Holiday Bowl